Jacob Michael Young (born September 21, 1997) is an American professional basketball player who last played for the Memphis Hustle of the NBA G League. He played college basketball for the Oregon Ducks of the Pac-12 Conference. He also played for the Texas Longhorns and the Rutgers Scarlet Knights.

High school career
Young played basketball for Yates High School in Houston. He was a two-time Class 5A All-State selection. He committed to playing college basketball for Texas over offers from Baylor, Duquesne and Memphis.

College career
Young struggled as a freshman at Texas, averaging 3.7 points per game and shooting 28 percent from the field. In his sophomore season, he averaged 6.2 points per game, before transferring to Rutgers. He sat out for one year due to transfer rules. As a junior, Young averaged 8.5 points, 2.7 rebounds and 1.9 assists per game. He was suspended for one game for a violation of team rules; he pleaded guilty to reckless driving. As a senior, Young averaged 14.1 points, 3.4 assists and 1.7 steals per game. On March 26, 2021, he declared for the 2021 NBA draft and entered the transfer portal. On June 2, 2021, Young transferred to Oregon.

Professional career

Memphis Hustle (2023)
On October 23, 2022, Young was named to the Memphis Hustle training camp roster via local tryout. However, he did not make the final roster. On January 20, 2023, Young was reacquired by the Memphis Hustle. On February 25, 2023, Young was waived.

Career statistics

College

|-
| style="text-align:left;"| 2016–17
| style="text-align:left;"| Texas
| 33 || 5 || 16.4 || .287 || .227 || .786 || .9 || .8 || .2 || .0 || 3.7
|-
| style="text-align:left;"| 2017–18
| style="text-align:left;"| Texas
| 30 || 5 || 16.8 || .413 || .323 || .682 || 1.7 || .7 || .7 || .0 || 6.2
|-
| style="text-align:left;"| 2018–19
| style="text-align:left;"| Rutgers
| style="text-align:center;" colspan="11"|  Redshirt
|-
| style="text-align:left;"| 2019–20
| style="text-align:left;"| Rutgers
| 30 || 0 || 21.3 || .413 || .277 || .591 || 2.7 || 1.9 || 1.0 || .0 || 8.5
|-
| style="text-align:left;"| 2020–21
| style="text-align:left;"| Rutgers
| 28 || 20 || 30.1 || .469 || .369 || .726 || 1.9 || 3.4 || 1.7 || .0 || 14.1
|- class="sortbottom"
| style="text-align:center;" colspan="2"| Career
| 121 || 30 || 20.9 || .412 || .295 || .677 || 1.8 || 1.7 || .9 || .0 || 7.9

Personal life
Young's father, Michael, played college basketball for Houston, where he was a part of Phi Slama Jama, before embarking on a 14-year professional career in the NBA and other leagues. His older brother, Joe, was drafted into the NBA following a college career at Houston and Oregon. Another brother, Michael Jr., played college football at Houston. His sisters, Mayorca and Milan, were track and field athletes in college.

References

External links
Oregon Ducks bio
Rutgers Scarlet Knight bio
Texas Longhorns bio

1997 births
Living people
American men's basketball players
Basketball players from Houston
Memphis Hustle players
Oregon Ducks men's basketball players
Point guards
Rutgers Scarlet Knights men's basketball players
Texas Longhorns men's basketball players